Andrew Sterett (January 27, 1778 – January 9, 1807)[8] was an officer in the United States Navy during the nation's early days.  He saw combat during the Quasi-War with France and in the Barbary Wars, commanding the schooner USS Enterprise in both conflicts.

Early life
Born in Baltimore, Maryland, Andrew Sterett was the son of John Sterett, a former Revolutionary War captain and a successful shipping merchant.  The fourth of ten children, he nevertheless inherited a sizable amount of money.  Despite this, he resolved to join the Navy, and was commissioned as a lieutenant on 25 March 1798.

The Quasi-War
Sterett's first assignment was as Third Lieutenant of the USS Constellation, under Captain Thomas Truxtun, which was sent to do battle with French vessels during the Quasi-War.  He was commanding a gun battery when Constellation  defeated and captured the French frigate Insurgente on 9 February 1799.  Insurgente lost 29 dead and 41 wounded; the only American loss was a seaman run through by Sterett's saber in a summary execution, the seaman, Neal Harvey, having abandoned his post in a panic.  Upon Constellation's arrival back in Baltimore, the anti-federalist press, who opposed the military in general and the Quasi-War in particular, seized upon this incident as an example of the Navy's "arrogance and cold-bloodedness".  The objections intensified when Sterett was heard to say, "We put men to death for even looking pale on this ship."  The Navy, however, soon promoted Sterett to the rank of first lieutenant.

A year later, Sterett was involved in a battle to a draw with the 54-gun French frigate Vengeance.  Soon afterward, he took command of the schooner USS Enterprise where he remained through the end of the Quasi-War, capturing the privateer Amour de la Patrie on 24 December 1800.

The Barbary Wars
After resupplying in Baltimore, Sterett sailed Enterprise to the Barbary Coast in June, 1801, as part of a force under Commodore Richard Dale, in the first stages of the Barbary Wars.

On 1 August 1801, Enterprise under Sterett's command defeated the 14-gun Tripoli, a Tripolitan corsair.  After twice faking surrender, Tripoli suffered 30 dead and 30 wounded, including the Captain, Rais Mahomet Rous, and the first officer.  Enterprise suffered no casualties.  Since there was no formal declaration of war, Enterprise was under orders not to take prizes.  After her crew was ordered to dump its guns overboard, Tripoli was allowed to sail home, where her captain was humiliated and punished.

Enterprise was sent back to Baltimore with dispatches after this engagement.  While there, on the recommendation of Congress, Sterett was presented by President Thomas Jefferson with a sword in gratitude of the victory over the Tripoli. Enterprise's crew was also rewarded with an extra month's pay.  The ship returned to the Mediterranean in November 1802.

Sterett turned over command of the Enterprise to Stephen Decatur in April 1803.  He was then promoted to Master Commandant and offered the command of a brig which was under construction.

Resignation
Sterett had been senior in rank to Decatur, but due to their comparative length of service, in 1803, Decatur was selected to be promoted above Sterett.  Sterett therefore resigned from the Navy, on 29 June 1805, to join the merchant marine.

Final voyage
In August 1806, Sterett was hired by Baltimore ship owner Lemuel Taylor to captain Taylor's sloop Warren on a trading voyage to the North West coast of America and China (though there were rumors that the ship was actually headed to the West Indies or South America with a cargo of contraband).  Taylor selected Procopio Pollock, son of Revolutionary War financier Oliver Pollock, as the Warren's supercargo (cargo master).  Both men were given sealed orders that were not to be opened until a certain point in the voyage.

On 12 September, the Warren sailed out of Baltimore with a complement of about 112 men, including four officers (all previously known to Sterett).  In early December, off the coast of Brazil, Sterett and Pollock opened their instructions.  To his horror Sterett discovered that Taylor's orders to Pollock gave Pollock control over not only the cargo but operational control of the vessel as well; they stated that the ship was to proceed to the west coast of South America, where Pollock was to engage in trade as he saw fit.  These orders, different from those given to Sterett and in violation of the articles of employment signed by the crew, caused a violent argument between Sterett and Pollock.  Sterett seems to have been driven into a frenzy bordering on madness; he was heard by members of the crew to say that before he would follow such orders he would kill either Pollock or himself.  About a week later, after apparently trying unsuccessfully to shoot Pollock, Captain Sterett retired to his cabin alone and shot himself in the head.  He lingered in agonizing pain for two weeks before dying on 9 January 1807, a few weeks shy of his 29th birthday and shortly before the ship rounded Cape Horn.  Neither the records of the Warren or a lawsuit later filed against Taylor by the crew make any mention of Sterett's body, so it is presumed that he was buried at sea.

Legacy
Four ships of the United States Navy have been named USS Sterett in his honor.

References

Further reading
Guttridge, Leonard F. & Jay D. Smith. The Commodores: The U.S. Navy in the Age of Sail. New York: Harper & Row, Publishers, 1969. 
Lambert, Frank. The Barbary Wars: American Independence in the Atlantic World. New York: Hill & Wang, 2005. .
London, Joshua E. Victory in Tripoli: How America's War with the Barbary Pirates Established the U.S. Navy and Shaped a Nation. New Jersey: John Wiley & Sons, Inc., 2005. .
Wheelan, Joseph (2003). Jefferson's War: America's First War on Terror, 1801-1805. New York: Carroll & Graf Publishers, 464 pages, ; Book
Whipple, A.B.C. To the Shores of Tripoli: The Birth of the U.S. Navy and Marines. New York: William Morrow & Co., Inc., 1991. .

1778 births
1807 deaths
United States Navy officers
Military personnel from Baltimore
American military personnel of the Quasi-War
American military personnel of the First Barbary War